Almopos Aridea Football Club is a Greek professional football club based in Aridea, Pella, Greece, which competes in the Super League 2, the second tier of the Greek football league system.

History
Almopos Aridea was founded in 1926 and its name derives from the ancient region of Almopia, located in the homonymous town of Pella.

The club's last appearance in a professional championship was in the 1984–85 season, when it competed in the Beta Ethniki, where it was relegated due to a deduction.

In recent years, they have been competing in local EPS categories. Pella. In the 2015–16 season, they finished undefeated and had the absolute victory in the championship and climbing bar, with the exception of two clashes, where he was tied, thus winning the promotion to the Gamma Ethniki.

Honours

Domestic
 Third Division: 1
 1983–84
 Fourth Division: 1
 2019–20
 Pella FCA Champions: 6
 1971–72, 1987–88, 1999–2000, 2000–01, 2012–13, 2015–16
 Pella FCA Cup Winners: 2
 2001–02, 2005–06

Players

Current squad

Notable former players
Antonis Minou
Loukas Vyntra
Giannis Taralidis
Ilias Solakis

Football clubs in Central Macedonia
Pella (regional unit)
Association football clubs established in 1926
1926 establishments in Greece
Gamma Ethniki clubs
Super League Greece 2 clubs